Dog Lake can refer to:

Canada
Dog Lake (Ontario), Kaministiquia River, Thunder Bay District
Dog Lake (Lessard Township, Algoma District)
Dog Lake (Noonan Lake, Kenora District)
Dog Lake (Severn River, Kenora District)
Dog Lake (Yesno Township, Thunder Bay District)
Dog Lake (Lennox and Addington County)
Dog Lake (Nipissing District)
Dog Lake (North Frontenac)
Dog Lake (Dog Creek, Kenora District)
Dog Lake (Keys Lake, Kenora District)
Dog Lake (Riggs Township, Algoma District)
Dog Lake (South Frontenac)
Dog Lake (Parry Sound District)
Dog Lake (Central Frontenac)
Dog Lake (British Columbia), Okanagan Valley, British Columbia

United States
Dog Lake (Minnesota) in Le Sueur County, Minnesota
Dog Lake (California), in Yosemite National Park near Tuolumne Meadows
Dog Lake (Brighton, Utah), in Salt Lake County, Utah near Brighton
Dog Lake (Mount Aire, Utah), in Salt Lake County, Utah between Millcreek Canyon and Big Cottonwood Canyon